Olive Brasno (October 17, 1917 – January 25, 1998) was a [dwarf]] dancer and actress who was known for her song and dance act with her brother, George. She also appeared in a few films through the 1930s and 1940s.

Born in the community of Old Bridge, New Jersey, and later residing in South River, Olive and George Brasno were first recognized as a brother-and-sister dwarf singing team in a partnership with Buster Shaver's vaudeville act.

Career
Dancer/actress Olive Brasno Wayne spent the bulk of her career performing on stage, but she also occasionally appeared in feature films. She launched her professional career dancing and singing in vaudeville along with her brother George Brasno. The act was called "Buster Shaver, Olive and George", and it toured nationally. She and George appeared in Little Miss Broadway (1938) opposite Shirley Temple. Other film credits include The Mighty Barnum (1934) and Sitting Pretty (1933). She and her brother appeared in one of the original Charlie Chan films with Warner Oland, Charlie Chan at the Circus, in 1936. She appeared with her brother in at least two Our Gang shorts, singing "The Ice Cream Song" in "Shrimps for a Day."

She was offered a part as a "Munchkin" in The Wizard of Oz (1939) but turned it down because she and her brother were making more money in vaudeville.

Personal life
Olive Brasno married dwarf actor Gus Wayne, who played one of the Munchkin soldiers in The Wizard of Oz; the couple were married for 37 years.

Death
Olive Brasno died in Lakeland, Florida, on January 25, 1998, at the age of 80. After 37 years of marriage, she outlived her husband by two days.

References

External links
 
 

1917 births
1998 deaths
American film actresses
Actors with dwarfism
20th-century American actresses
People from East Brunswick, New Jersey
People from South River, New Jersey